Estefanía (Fani) Domínguez Calvo (born 8 February 1984 in Badajoz) is a Spanish professional triathlete, 2009 Galician Duathlon Champion, and 2010 Galician Aquathlon Champion. She represents the Club Triatlon Cidade de Lugo Fluvial.

Estefanía Domínguez is a qualified PE teacher and studied Ciencias de la Actividad Física y deporte.

ITU Competitions 
In the three years from 2008 to 2010, Domínguez took part in 11 ITU events and achieved 2 top ten positions.
The following list is based upon the official ITU rankings and the ITU Athletes's Profile Page.
Unless indicated otherwise, the following events are Olympic Distance Triathlons and refer to the Elite category.

External links 
 Estefania Dominguez' Blog

Notes 

Spanish female triathletes
1984 births
Living people
21st-century Spanish women